Nomreh-ye Seh-e Kupal (also Romanized as Nomreh-ye Seh-e Kūpāl; also known as Nomreh-ye Seh) is a village in Gheyzaniyeh Rural District, in the Central District of Ahvaz County, Khuzestan Province, Iran. At the 2006 census, its population was 319, in 69 families.

References 

Populated places in Ahvaz County